Stanisław Flanek (18 April 1919 – 4 November 2009) was a Polish footballer. He played in eight matches for the Poland national football team from 1947 to 1950.

References

External links
 

1919 births
2009 deaths
Polish footballers
Poland international footballers
Footballers from Kraków
Association football defenders
Wisła Kraków players